Charles Halford (born February 28, 1980) is an American actor. He is best known for playing Chas Chandler on the NBC series Constantine, Earl in Logan Lucky and Sammy Wilds in Bad Times at the El Royale. Known for his distinctively deep voice, he also provided the voices of Konstantin in Rise of the Tomb Raider, Gorilla Grodd in Injustice 2 and Bibbo Bibbowski and the Eradicator in The Death of Superman and Reign of the Supermen.

Filmography

Film

Television

Video games

External links

Living people
1960 births
American male film actors
Male actors from Salt Lake City
American male television actors
American male video game actors
American male voice actors
21st-century American male actors